Union Hill is an unincorporated community located in the Bryan Township of western Surry County, North Carolina, United States, located between Little Mountain and the south fork of the Mitchell River .

References
 

Unincorporated communities in Surry County, North Carolina
Unincorporated communities in North Carolina